Frate Sole (Brother Sun) is a 1918 Italian silent film based on the life of St Francis of Assisi, directed by Ugo Falena and Mario Corsi.

The film has four episodes, The kiss of the leper, In the footsteps of St. Francis of Assisi, Time, and The stigmata.

The film was restored in 1998 with the assistance of Cineteca Italiana.

Cast
Umberto Palmarini as St Francis of Assisi
Silvia Malinverni as Clare of Assisi
Rina Calabria as Agnes of Assisi, sister of Clare
Filippo Ricci as Elia Buonbarone
Lucienne Myosa as Sibilia, la cortigiana
Bruno Emanuel Palmi as a nobleman

References

External links 
 

1918 films
1910s historical drama films
Italian historical drama films
1910s Italian-language films
Italian silent feature films
Films set in the 13th century
Italian black-and-white films
1918 drama films
Italian biographical drama films
Cultural depictions of Francis of Assisi
Films directed by Ugo Falena
Silent drama films